The Adavinainar Dam  is located at the foothills of Western Ghats and border of Kerala, built across the Hanumanadhi River near Mekkarai, Vadakarai in the Tenkasi district of Tamil Nadu, Southern India. It provides water for irrigation to the region of Sengottai Taluk.

Construction
The dam construction was started in 1996. It was completed and opened in 2002.

Dimensions and Capacity
 Maximum height of the dam is 51.5 m
 Effective capacity of the dam at FRL is 4.927 Mcum
 Length of masonry dam is 670 m
 Length of uncontrolled weir is 100 M
 Catchment area is 15.54 km2

Basin
East flowing rivers between Pennar and Kanyakumari.

Maintenance
This Dam is maintained by Water Resources Department which in turn is managed by the Tamil Nadu Public Works Department.

Tourist attraction
This dam has a medium size park near its downstream. Over 2 km along the side of the dam is a fall. Due to an order by the district collector people are prohibited from this area and have therefore no entry to the dam.

Transportation

By Road: The dam is situated at 15 km from Kadayanallur, 85 km from Tirunelveli, 14 km from Sengottai,7 km from Vadakarai

By Train: The nearest railway station is sengottai station. Sengottai station is well connected with Kollam and Chennai. 

By Air: The nearest airport is Thiruvananthapuram International airport(TRV) which is 117 km away from the Dam. International Air connectivity is available from Thiruvananthapuram

References

Dams in Tamil Nadu
Dams completed in 2002
2002 establishments in Tamil Nadu
Tenkasi district